Gerard John Glover (born 27 September 1946) is an English former professional footballer who played in the Football League for Everton and Mansfield Town.

References

1946 births
Living people
English footballers
Association football midfielders
English Football League players
Everton F.C. players
Mansfield Town F.C. players
Northwich Victoria F.C. players
Runcorn F.C. Halton players
South Liverpool F.C. players
Footballers from Liverpool